The 1901 season in Swedish football, starting January 1901 and ending December 1901:

Honours

Official titles

Competitions

Promotions, relegations and qualifications

Promotions

Domestic results

Svenska Mästerskapet 1901 
Final

Kamratmästerskapen 1901 
Final

Rosenska Pokalen 1901 

Final

Notes

References 
Print

Online

 
Seasons in Swedish football